Niels Vink defeated Sam Schröder in the final, 6–4, 7–6(10–8) to win the quad singles wheelchair tennis title at the 2022 French Open.

Dylan Alcott was the three-time reigning champion, but retired from professional wheelchair tennis in January 2022.

Seeds

Draw

Finals

References

External Links
 Draw

Wheelchair Quad Singles
French Open, 2022 Quad Singles